The Buffalo Niagara Convention Center is a convention center in downtown Buffalo, New York. Opened in 1978 at 64,410 square feet, the convention center underwent an expansion in 2010. The center holds events such as job fairs, food events, comic cons, and the World's Largest Disco.

In 2019, following a 90-day period taking input from the public, Erie County officials began exploring the potential replacement or further expansion of the convention center. According to the study, the majority of residents polled (86 percent) are in favor of investing in a new facility. The Buffalo Niagara Convention Center has been seen as "outdated" and smaller than convention centers in cities similar to Buffalo.

References

1978 establishments in New York (state)
Boxing venues in New York (state)
Buildings and structures in Buffalo, New York
Convention centers in New York (state)
Sports venues completed in 1978
Sports venues in Buffalo, New York
Sports venues in Erie County, New York
Sports venues in New York (state)